"Force of Nature" is the 161st episode of the American science fiction television series Star Trek: The Next Generation. It is the ninth episode of the seventh season.

Set in the 24th century, the series follows the adventures of the Starfleet crew of the Federation starship Enterprise-D. In this episode, a pair of sibling scientists show that warp drive propulsion is harming the very fabric of space.  A sub-plot involves Data attempting to train his pet cat, Spot.

Plot
The Federation starship USS Enterprise is sent to the Hekaras Corridor, the only safe path through the sector, to investigate the disappearance of the medical ship USS Fleming. In the process they find a Ferengi ship, which is badly disabled. The Ferengi leader contends a Federation weapon disabled his ship.

The Enterprise crew learns that Hekaran brother and sister Rabal and Serova are responsible for sabotaging the ships by using ship-disabling mines disguised as signal buoys. These siblings contend that sustained warp drive is destroying the fabric of space near their homeworld, and will eventually destroy their planet. Data determines that the research has merit, but requires more study. Picard requests a more thorough investigation from the Federation Science Council.

However, Serova is not willing to wait for any more studies. In order to prove her theory, she causes a warp breach in her ship, killing herself in the process. A rift is formed, and the Fleming becomes trapped in the damaged space. The Enterprise crew manages to find a way to "surf" through the rift without using warp drive within it by initiating a short warp jump at maximum speed, then beams up the Fleming crew and escapes by "riding" the disruption waves produced by the rift.

Later, the Federation Council issues a new directive limiting all Federation vessels to a speed of warp five except in extreme emergencies. In addition, they have informed every known species capable of warp travel of the newly discovered dangers of its use. Worf asserts that the Klingon Empire will agree to the limitations, but it is uncertain whether the Romulan Star Empire, Ferengi Alliance, and Cardassian Union will also follow suit.

Reception

In 2020, ScreenRant noted this as one of the top ten Star Trek: The Next Generation episodes with an important moral message.

Releases 
"Force of Nature" has been released as part of TNG Season 7 collections on DVD and Blu-Ray formats. Season seven of TNG, which contains this episode was released on Blu-ray disc in January 2015.

References

External links

 

Star Trek: The Next Generation (season 7) episodes
1993 American television episodes